A ruler is a device used to measure distances or draw straight lines.

Ruler may also refer to:
 A person who wields significant or total political power
 Ruler (film), a 2019 Indian Telugu-language action film
 Ruler (horse), a racehorse
 Golomb ruler, comprises a series of marks such that no two pairs of marks are the same distance apart
 Slide rule, a mechanical analog computer

See also 
 Rule (disambiguation)